Michael Dumontier (born 1974) is a contemporary artist who lives and works in Winnipeg. His work has been exhibited internationally including in New York City, Boston, and Padova, Italy. He is known in particular his minimal paintings and collages. He may be best known for this collaborations with Marcel Dzama, Neil Farber and others as a founding member of The Royal Art Lodge.

Dumontier was born in Winnipeg, Manitoba, Canada.

Gallery Representation
Dumontier is currently represented by MKG127 in Toronto.

References

1974 births
Artists from Winnipeg
Canadian contemporary artists
Living people